Türkan Saylan (13 December 1935 – 18 May 2009) was a Turkish medical doctor in dermatology, academic, writer, teacher and social activist.  She was famous for fighting leprosy, and for founding a charitable foundation called "Association for the Support of Contemporary Living" (Çağdaş Yaşamı Destekleme Derneği, ÇYDD).

Life and career 
She was born on 13 December 1935. She was the first born to Fasih Galip, one of the first building contractors in Turkey's republican era, and Swiss Lili Mina Raiman who converted to Islam and changed her name to Leyla after the marriage.

She went to Kandilli Elementary School between 1944 and 1946. Between 1946 and 1953, she went to Kandilli Girls Highschool. She graduated from İstanbul Medical School in 1963. Later on, she worked as a doctor in the department of dermatological and venereal diseases in SSK Nisantasi Hospital.

In 1976, she started to study leprosy and founded Fight Against Lepra Association and Foundation. She was awarded "International Gandhi Award" in 1986, India. She worked as a consultant in lepra for World Health Organization until 2006. She took a part in foundation of Laboratory of Derma pathology, Behcet's Disease and Policlinics of Sexually Transmitted Diseases. She has worked as the voluntary head physician in Istanbul Lepra Hospital for 21 years, between 1981 and 2002.

She got married in 1957 and had two children. She has four grand children. Having suffered from breast cancer for 17 years, she died on 18 May 2009.

See also
 Women in Turkey

References

Further reading 
 Daniella Kuzmanovic (2012), "At the Margins of the Ergenekon Investigation: Central Features of Politics in Turkey", Middle East Critique, Vol. 21, Iss. 2, 2012

External links
 Türkan Saylan: Syöpään menehtynyttä hyväntekijää epäiltiin yhteyksistä salaliittoon Turkissa Suomen Kuvalehti 18 May 2009 (in Finnish)
 Erol Önderoğlu. (19 May 2009). Death of Türkan Saylan: "State Should Apologise" Bianet 

1935 births
2009 deaths
Physicians from Istanbul
Deaths from cancer in Turkey
Deaths from breast cancer
Turkish dermatologists
Burials at Zincirlikuyu Cemetery
Istanbul University Faculty of Medicine alumni
Turkish women academics